Psalm 101 is the 101st psalm from the Book of Psalms. The Latin name is Misericordiam et judicium. It is attributed to David, and provides warnings for the wicked, while explaining the benefits the righteous will reap. In the slightly different numbering system used in the Greek Septuagint version of the Bible, and in the Latin Vulgate, this psalm is Psalm 100.

Text
The text of this psalm in the King James Version reads as follows:
I will sing of mercy and judgment: unto thee, O Lord, will I sing.
I will behave myself wisely in a perfect way. O when wilt thou come unto me? I will walk within my house with a perfect heart.
I will set no wicked thing before mine eyes: I hate the work of them that turn aside; it shall not cleave to me.
A froward heart shall depart from me: I will not know a wicked person.
Whoso privily slandereth his neighbour, him will I cut off: him that hath an high look and a proud heart will not I suffer.
Mine eyes shall be upon the faithful of the land, that they may dwell with me: he that walketh in a perfect way, he shall serve me.
He that worketh deceit shall not dwell within my house: he that telleth lies shall not tarry in my sight.
I will early destroy all the wicked of the land; that I may cut off all wicked doers from the city of the Lord.

Commentary 
According to Matthew Henry, "David was certainly the penman of this psalm", and he here "cuts out to himself and others a pattern both of a good magistrate and a good master of a family; and, if these were careful to discharge the duty of their place, it would contribute very much to a universal reformation.

Verses
"I will sing of mercy and justice" (verse 1): God's "mercy" and "justice" go together, because when justice pronounces its righteous penalty, mercy may grant relief. As king, David knows that before he could exercise mercy and justice in His kingdom, he had to understand and extol the mercy and justice of God.

"I will behave wisely in a perfect way" (verse 2): David determined that his reign would be marked by integrity and godliness, that is, to live a wise and holy life (perfect way), because as he came into a position of greater power, he experienced that power often exposes the flaws of character, if it does not actually help create them.

 "I will walk within my house with a perfect heart": David's righteous life had to be real in his conduct within his own house, before it could be applied in the courts of his kingdom.

 "I will set nothing wicked before my eyes" (verses 3–4): One measure of a righteous life was what one chose to set before the eyes, as the lust of the eyes is a significant aspect of the lure of this world.

 "Whoever secretly slanders his neighbor" (verse 5): To lie or speak in an evil way against another is a significant and grievous sin and the worst of it is done secretly, so David was determined to oppose all who did so ("Him I will destroy").

 "My eyes shall be on the faithful of the land" (verses 6–8): Instead of looking at those who thought themselves better than others, David preferred to look at the faithful, deciding that they would dwell with him. 

"Early I will destroy all the wicked of the land": David's determination to rule in favor of the godly, made him decide to remove the wicked early on from the city of God.

Uses

Catholic Church 
Since the Middle Ages, this psalm was traditionally performed at the office of matins the Friday, according to the Rule of St. Benedict established in 530.

In the Liturgy of the Hours, Psalm 101 is sung or recited at Lauds on Tuesday of the fourth week of the four weekly cycle of liturgical prayers.

Anglican Communion 
In the Book of Common Prayer of the Church of England, and in liturgies derived from them,  Psalm 101 is traditionally said or sung at Evensong on the 19th day of each month.

References

External links 

 in Hebrew and English - Mechon-mamre
 King James Bible - Wikisource

101
Works attributed to David